The arrondissement of Nyons is an arrondissement of France in the Drôme department in the Auvergne-Rhône-Alpes region. It has 149 communes.

Composition

The 149 communes of the arrondissement of Nyons, and their INSEE codes, are:

Aleyrac (26003)
Allan (26005)
Ancône (26008)
Arpavon (26013)
Aubres (26016)
Aulan (26018)
Ballons (26022)
Barret-de-Lioure (26026)
La Bâtie-Rolland (26031)
La Baume-de-Transit (26033)
Beauvoisin (26043)
La Bégude-de-Mazenc (26045)
Bellecombe-Tarendol (26046)
Bénivay-Ollon (26048)
Bésignan (26050)
Bézaudun-sur-Bîne (26051)
Bonlieu-sur-Roubion (26052)
Bouchet (26054)
Bourdeaux (26056)
Bouvières (26060)
Buis-les-Baronnies (26063)
Chamaret (26070)
Chantemerle-lès-Grignan (26073)
La Charce (26075)
Charols (26078)
Châteauneuf-de-Bordette (26082)
Châteauneuf-du-Rhône (26085)
Chaudebonne (26089)
Chauvac-Laux-Montaux (26091)
Clansayes (26093)
Cléon-d'Andran (26095)
Colonzelle (26099)
Comps (26101)
Condillac (26102)
Condorcet (26103)
Cornillac (26104)
Cornillon-sur-l'Oule (26105)
La Coucourde (26106)
Crupies (26111)
Curnier (26112)
Dieulefit (26114)
Donzère (26116)
Espeluche (26121)
Eygalayes (26126)
Eygaliers (26127)
Eyroles (26130)
Eyzahut (26131)
Ferrassières (26135)
La Garde-Adhémar (26138)
Les Granges-Gontardes (26145)
Grignan (26146)
Izon-la-Bruisse (26150)
Laborel (26153)
Lachau (26154)
La Laupie (26157)
Lemps (26161)
Malataverne (26169)
Manas (26171)
Marsanne (26176)
Mérindol-les-Oliviers (26180)
Mévouillon (26181)
Mirabel-aux-Baronnies (26182)
Mollans-sur-Ouvèze (26188)
Montauban-sur-l'Ouvèze (26189)
Montaulieu (26190)
Montboucher-sur-Jabron (26191)
Montbrison-sur-Lez (26192)
Montbrun-les-Bains (26193)
Montélimar (26198)
Montferrand-la-Fare (26199)
Montfroc (26200)
Montguers (26201)
Montjoux (26202)
Montjoyer (26203)
Montréal-les-Sources (26209)
Montségur-sur-Lauzon (26211)
Nyons (26220)
Orcinas (26222)
Le Pègue (26226)
Pelonne (26227)
La Penne-sur-l'Ouvèze (26229)
Piégon (26233)
Pierrelatte (26235)
Pierrelongue (26236)
Les Pilles (26238)
Plaisians (26239)
Le Poët-en-Percip (26242)
Le Poët-Laval (26243)
Le Poët-Sigillat (26244)
Pommerol (26245)
Pont-de-Barret (26249)
Portes-en-Valdaine (26251)
Propiac (26256)
Puygiron (26257)
Réauville (26261)
Reilhanette (26263)
Rémuzat (26264)
Rioms (26267)
Rochebaudin (26268)
Rochebrune (26269)
Rochefort-en-Valdaine (26272)
Rochegude (26275)
Roche-Saint-Secret-Béconne (26276)
La Roche-sur-le-Buis (26278)
La Rochette-du-Buis (26279)
Roussas (26284)
Rousset-les-Vignes (26285)
Roussieux (26286)
Roynac (26287)
Sahune (26288)
Saint-Auban-sur-l'Ouvèze (26292)
Sainte-Euphémie-sur-Ouvèze (26303)
Sainte-Jalle (26306)
Saint-Ferréol-Trente-Pas (26304)
Saint-Gervais-sur-Roubion (26305)
Saint-Marcel-lès-Sauzet (26312)
Saint-Maurice-sur-Eygues (26317)
Saint-May (26318)
Saint-Pantaléon-les-Vignes (26322)
Saint-Paul-Trois-Châteaux (26324)
Saint-Restitut (26326)
Saint-Sauveur-Gouvernet (26329)
Salettes (26334)
Salles-sous-Bois (26335)
Saulce-sur-Rhône (26337)
Sauzet (26338)
Savasse (26339)
Séderon (26340)
Solérieux (26342)
Souspierre (26343)
Suze-la-Rousse (26345)
Taulignan (26348)
Teyssières (26350)
Les Tonils (26351)
La Touche (26352)
Les Tourrettes (26353)
Truinas (26356)
Tulette (26357)
Valaurie (26360)
Valouse (26363)
Venterol (26367)
Verclause (26369)
Vercoiran (26370)
Vers-sur-Méouge (26372)
Vesc (26373)
Villebois-les-Pins (26374)
Villefranche-le-Château (26375)
Villeperdrix (26376)
Vinsobres (26377)

History

The arrondissement of Nyons was created in 1800. In 2006 it absorbed the four cantons of Dieulefit, Marsanne, Montélimar-1 and Montélimar-2 from the arrondissement of Valence. At the January 2017 reorganisation of the arrondissements of Drôme, it gained one commune from the arrondissement of Valence and six communes from the arrondissement of Die.

As a result of the reorganisation of the cantons of France which came into effect in 2015, the borders of the cantons are no longer related to the borders of the arrondissements. The eleven cantons of the arrondissement of Nyons were, as of January 2015:

 Buis-les-Baronnies
 Dieulefit
 Grignan
 Marsanne
 Montélimar-1
 Montélimar-2
 Nyons
 Pierrelatte
 Rémuzat
 Saint-Paul-Trois-Châteaux
 Séderon

References

Nyons